Harry Hutton "Rags" Turpin (May 10, 1902 – December 26, 1974) was an American football coach and college athletics administrator. He served as the head football coach at his alma mater, Northwestern State University in Natchitoches, Louisiana, from 1934 to 1956, compiling a record of 99–91–2. Turpin was also the athletic director at Northwestern State from 1951 to 1957.

Turpin began his playing career in 1921 to Tulane University in New Orleans, Louisiana in 1921.

References

External links
 

1902 births
1974 deaths
Northwestern State Demons and Lady Demons athletic directors
Northwestern State Demons football coaches
Northwestern State Demons football players
Tulane Green Wave football players